Woodbine is a residential neighbourhood in the southwest quadrant of Calgary, Alberta. It is located at the western edge of the city, and is bordered on the north by Anderson Road, on the west by  Tsuut'ina Trail, on the east by 24th Street West, and to the south by Fish Creek Provincial Park.

Woodbine was established in 1979. It is represented in the Calgary City Council

Demographics

Residents in this community had a median household income of $83,844 in 2000, and there were 7.3% low income residents living in the neighbourhood. As of 2000, 21.8% of the residents were immigrants. Most buildings were single-family detached homes, and 9.4% of the housing was used for renting.

Crime statistics in Woodbine are quite favorable compared to the rest of Calgary.  In both 2006 and 2007 "Person" crimes were rated by the Calgary Police Service as 3 per 1000 population.  Property crimes were 9 and 12 per 1000 population respectively.  Both rates were among the lowest recorded for Calgary communities.

Education
The St. Jude Elementary School (Catholic) as well as the Woodbine Elementary public school are located in this neighborhood.

See also
List of neighbourhoods in Calgary

References

External links
Woodcreek (Woodbine-Woodlands) Community Association

Neighbourhoods in Calgary